There were 28 archery events at the 2010 South American Games. Medals were given to each individual distance at the qualifying round, to the overall result at the qualifying round, to the olympic tournament and the team event for recurve and compound bows for men and women.

Medal summary

Medal table

Medalists

 
2010 South American Games
South American Games
2010
International archery competitions hosted by Colombia